The Shuangliao–Nenjiang Expressway, designated as G4512 and commonly referred to as the Shuangnen Expressway, is a partially completed expressway in China. It is a major north–south expressway that when complete, will connect the cities of Nenjiang City, in Heilongjiang, with Shuangliao, in Jilin, near the border with Inner Mongolia.

History 
This expressway has formerly been wrongly signed using the NTHS-like code "G47."

References 

Chinese national-level expressways
Expressways in Heilongjiang
Expressways in Jilin
Expressways in Liaoning